Armande Gobry-Valle (born 1953) is a French woman of letters. She was a teacher in Troyes. She wrote for more than twenty years without seeking a publisher. In 1990, the  published Terre tranquille, a collection of short stories. She was awarded the prix Goncourt du premier roman in 1991 for Iblis ou la Défroque du serpent. The author of seven novels, Gobry-Valle is also a préfacière of art books.

Works 
1990: Terre tranquille, éditions Viviane Hamy, 
1991: Iblis ou la Défroque du serpent, éd. Viviane Hamy, 
1993: La Convulsion des brasiers, éd. Viviane Hamy, 
1993: Un triptyque, éd. Viviane Hamy, 
1995: Le Puits d'exil, éd. Viviane Hamy, 
1995: Le Témoin compromis, éd. Viviane Hamy, 
1997: Nocturnes, éd. Viviane Hamy, 
2000: Debout parmi les ruines, éditions du Seuil,

Sources

External links 
 Une demie-académie Goncourt, la noirceur cannibale d'Armande on Le Soir (22 April 1991)
 Armande Gobry-Valle on éditions Viviane Hamy
 Armande Gobry-Valle on Babelio

20th-century French novelists
20th-century French women writers
Prix Goncourt du Premier Roman recipients
1953 births
Living people